Chris McAllister (born March 3, 1991) is an American football defensive end for the Arizona Rattlers of the Indoor Football League (IFL). He attended Judson High School in Converse, Texas; upon graduating in 2009, he played football at Baylor University. During his time at Baylor, McAllister recorded a total of 15.0 sacks; this left him tied for the record of most career sacks in Baylor history. He led the team in sacks in 2012 and 2013 (with 6.0 and 6.5, respectively).

McAllister went undrafted in 2014. He eventually earned a tryout with the Houston Texans of the NFL, but failed to make the team. He was assigned to the San Jose SaberCats of the Arena Football League on July 30, 2015. He recorded statistics in exactly one game for the SaberCats; there, he assisted on a sack in the team's regular season finale against the Los Angeles Kiss. McAllister finished the season on the team's Injured Reserve list; despite this, he won his first AFL Championship when the SaberCats defeated the Jacksonville Sharks in ArenaBowl XXVIII.

On December 4, 2015, McAllister was assigned to the Arizona Rattlers. McAllister re-signed with Rattlers on November 21, 2016. McAllister was released on January 30, 2017, but was re-signed on February 9, 2017. McAllister was named First Team All-Indoor Football League in 2017. On July 8, the Rattlers defeated the Sioux Falls Storm in the United Bowl by a score of 50–41. He re-signed with the Rattlers on August 28, 2017.

References

External links
San Jose SaberCats bio
Baylor Bears bio 

1991 births
Living people
American football defensive ends
Baylor Bears football players
San Jose SaberCats players
Players of American football from Texas
People from Bexar County, Texas
Arizona Rattlers players
Judson High School alumni